The Archdiocese of Portland of the U.S. state of Oregon is home to several monasteries and other Catholic religious communities.

Male religious orders and communities 
Mount Angel Abbey - Benedictine, Mt. Angel
Our Lady of Guadalupe Trappist Abbey - Trappist, Lafayette
Priory of Our Lady of Consolation - Brigettine, Amity
The Grotto of our Sorrowful Mother Monastery - Servite, Portland

Female religious orders and communities 
Carmel of Maria Regina - Discalced Carmelite, Eugene
Franciscan Sisters of the Eucharist - Franciscan, the sisters have a retreat center in Bridal Veil and they also run the Franciscan Montessori Earth School & St. Francis Academy in Portland
Queen of Angels Monastery - Benedictine, Mt. Angel
Sisters of St. Mary of Oregon - Beaverton

Former religious orders 
Monastery of Our Lady of Jordan, Oregon - Cistercian, Jordan

See also
The Sisters of St. Joseph of Peace

References 

Roman Catholic Archdiocese of Portland in Oregon
Communities
Religious communities in Oregon